New Keywords: A Revised Vocabulary of Culture and Society is a book edited by Tony Bennett, Lawrence Grossberg and Meaghan Morris and published in 2005 by Blackwell Publishing. It is an attempt to revise Raymond Williams' seminal 1976 text, Keywords: A Vocabulary of Culture and Society.

See Also 
List of Keywords for Culture and Society
2005 non-fiction books